The Renfe Class 269 is a class of electric locomotives operated by Renfe in Spain. They were built by CAF and Macosa under license from Mitsubishi.

Variants
Multiple variants of the Class 269 exist:

 269.0: 80/140 km/h freight variant
 269.2: 100/160 km/h variant for intermodal and passenger trains
 269.5: 90/160 km/h variant for intermodal and freight trains
 269.7:  variant for intermodal trains
 269.9:  variant used for overnight services
 Four rebuilt locomotives with streamlined cabs for  operation

Technical specifications
The locomotives are equipped with monomotor bogies, which have two gears. They use rheostatic braking.

History
The locomotives were introduced in 1973. A total of 265 locomotives have been built.

Four Class 269 locomotives were sold to Empresa de los Ferrocarriles del Estado (EFE), the Chilean national rail operator, in 2003. Further withdrawn Class 269 locomotives went on sale in 2010.

References

External links

Locomotora eléctrica 269.0/1 - Renfe Alquiler 

Electric locomotives of Spain
Mitsubishi locomotives
Railway locomotives introduced in 1973
269